Silver Creek is a large creek that flows for approximately  through Madison County, Kentucky, in the United States.

Its headwaters are located south of Berea. It reaches its terminus northwest of Richmond at the Kentucky River. It is one of six major creeks flowing north through Madison County and emptying into the Kentucky River. The westernmost of these is Paint Lick Creek, which forms the boundary between Garrard and Madison Counties. Silver Creek flows parallel to Paint Lick Creek, and the two define the westernmost finger of Madison County, a long ridge known as Poosey Ridge.

See also
List of rivers of Kentucky

References 

Rivers of Kentucky
Bodies of water of Madison County, Kentucky